The thirtieth season of Saturday Night Live, an American sketch comedy series, originally aired in the United States on NBC between October 2, 2004, and May 21, 2005.

History
This season was notable for a lip-syncing gaffe by Ashlee Simpson during her second performance (on the episode hosted by Jude Law). This season was also home to many sketches focused on the 2004 U.S. Presidential election, but, unlike the 2000 election (and later, the elections for 2008 and 2016), there was little to no media coverage about the sketches.

Cast
Before the start of this season, longtime cast member Jimmy Fallon left the show after six seasons with the cast since 1998. In the wake of Fallon's departure, Fred Armisen was promoted to repertory status, while Finesse Mitchell and Kenan Thompson remained featured players.

New cast members this season included Rob Riggle, an improv comedian (at the Upright Citizens Brigade Theater) and U.S. Marine (making him the first and, only SNL cast member to serve in the Marines). This would also be Riggle's only season on the show. In addition, SNL writer Jason Sudeikis (who appeared in many bit roles before joining the cast) joined the cast as a featured player for the last three episodes of the season.

With Fallon gone, Amy Poehler became Tina Fey's co-anchor on Weekend Update, making Fey and Poehler the first and, through at least season 46, only two-woman anchor team.

Cast 

Repertory players
Fred Armisen
Rachel Dratch
Tina Fey
Will Forte
Darrell Hammond
Seth Meyers
Chris Parnell
Amy Poehler
Maya Rudolph
Horatio Sanz

Featured players
Finesse Mitchell
Rob Riggle
Jason Sudeikis (first episode: May 7, 2005)
Kenan Thompson

bold denotes "Weekend Update" anchor

Writers

Near the end of the season, writer Jason Sudeikis left the writing staff to join the cast.

Episodes

Specials

References

External links 
Saturday Night Live Season 30 on NBC.com

30
Saturday Night Live in the 2000s
2004 American television seasons
2005 American television seasons
Television shows directed by Beth McCarthy-Miller